Blockley may refer to:

Places
 Blockley, Gloucestershire (Worcestershire until 1931), England
 Blockley Station Brickworks Site of Special Scientific Interest
 Blockley Township, Pennsylvania, United States
 Blockley Almshouse, charity hospital and poorhouse, West Philadelphia
 Blockley Hall, Perelman School of Medicine. Philadelphia

People
 Jeff Blockley (born 1949), English footballer 
 Liam Blockley, rugby league footballer
 Nathan Blockley (born 1992), Scottish footballer